Across the Dark is the fourth full-length studio album by the Finnish melodic death metal band Insomnium. It was released on 7 September 2009 on Candlelight Records. The album features Jules Näveri from Profane Omen and Enemy of the Sun as guest vocalist and Aleksi Munter from Swallow the Sun as guest keyboardist.
The album was chosen as "Album of the month September, 2009" by German online magazine Metal 1.

The song "Weighed Down with Sorrow" is dedicated to Miika Tenkula.

Track listing

Charts

Personnel
Insomnium
 Niilo Sevänen – vocals, bass
 Ville Friman – guitar
 Ville Vänni – guitar
 Marcus Hirvonen – drums

Additional Musicians
 Aleksi Munter (Swallow the Sun) – keyboards
 Jules Näveri (Profane Omen, Enemy of the Sun) – clean vocals

References

2009 albums
Insomnium albums